Cilnia is a genus of praying mantises in the family Miomantidae that is native to Africa.

The genus Cilnia contains two species:
Cilnia chopardi
 Cilnia humeralis

See also
List of mantis genera and species

References

Mantidae
Mantodea of Africa
Mantodea genera
Taxa named by Carl Stål